Dostoevskaya is a Moscow Metro station in the Meshchansky District, Central Administrative Okrug, Moscow. It is on the Lyublinsko-Dmitrovskaya line, between Maryina Roshcha and Trubnaya stations.

Dostoevskaya opened on 19 June 2010 as a part of the northern line extension along with Maryina Roshcha station.

The station has two exits. One is near the building of the Russian Army Theatre, the other leads to Suvorovskaya Square.

Construction 
The construction of the station started in the 1990s although construction was shelved for several years insufficient funding. The construction process resumed only in 2007 when funds were allocated and both the right and left rail tunnels were built. The construction of the platform began afterwards. In April 2009, the lack of funds forced the Moscow Metro authorities to delay the station's opening to May 2010. Several days before the supposed opening date, it was delayed again to June for adjustments to the escalators.

Interchange 
The Metro planned to build Suvorovskaya station, which would allow transfers to the northern end of the Koltsevaya Line. In 2017, the Metro shelved plans for the station citing economic infeasibility.

Controversy 
Published photos of station's decor elements caused disputes within the Russian Internet community. There are two scenes of violence (homicide and suicide) depicted on the station walls as an illustration of Fyodor Dostoevsky's Crime and Punishment, along with many other scenes (including illustrations of The Idiot).

References 

Fyodor Dostoyevsky
Moscow Metro stations
Railway stations in Russia opened in 2010
Lyublinsko-Dmitrovskaya Line
Railway stations located underground in Russia